The 2012 Thurrock Council election took place on 3 May 2012 to elect members of Thurrock Borough Council in England. This was on the same day as other 2012 United Kingdom local elections.

The result was:
Labour       25 (+1)   (39% of vote)
Conservative 21 (-1)   (30%)
Independent   2        ( 7%)
UKIP          1 (+1)   (18%)
LibDem        0        ( 4%)
other         0        ( 2%)
vacant        0 (-1)

The Labour party took overall control (previously NOC with Labour administration).

References

2012 English local elections
2012
2010s in Essex